Feroze Khan (9 September 1904 – 21 April 2005) was a field hockey player who represented India at the Summer Olympic Games. At the time of his death, he was the world's oldest Olympic gold medal winner, following the death of U.S. athlete James Rockefeller in 2004. Khan was part of India's Olympic hockey team at the 1928 Summer Olympics in Amsterdam, the Netherlands, who won the gold medal for the event. At the club level, Khan played for Uttar Pradesh, Aligarh University and the Bombay Customs. After his death, Roger Beaufrand of France became the oldest living Olympic gold medal winner.

Khan was a Daanishmandan Pathan. His son Farooq Feroze Khan, followed a career in the Air Force and became the only PAF officer ever to serve as Chairman Joint Chiefs of Staff Committee, Pakistan's senior military appointment.

In his later years, he moved to Pakistan, and lived in Karachi where he served as a well-respected coach. He died of natural causes at the age of 100.

References

External links
 

1904 births
2005 deaths
Pakistani male field hockey players
Field hockey players at the 1928 Summer Olympics
Indian male field hockey players
Olympic gold medalists for India
Pakistani centenarians
Olympic medalists in field hockey
Medalists at the 1928 Summer Olympics
Indian emigrants to Pakistan
Men centenarians